The 1991–92 Iowa State Cyclones men's basketball team represented Iowa State University during the 1991–92 NCAA Division I men's basketball season. The Cyclones were coached by Johnny Orr, who was in his 12th season. They played their home games at Hilton Coliseum in Ames, Iowa.

They finished the season 21–13, 5–9 in Big Eight play to finish tied for seventh place. They upset third-seeded Missouri in the 1992 Big Eight conference tournament quarterfinals before falling to Oklahoma State in the semifinals. Despite a 5–9 conference record, the Cyclones qualified for the 1992 NCAA Division I men's basketball tournament, upsetting seventh seed UNC Charlotte, 76–74 in the East Regional first round before falling to second seeded Kentucky.

Games were televised by ESPN, CBS, Raycom, Prime Sports, the Cyclone Television Network and Heritage Cablevision (Drake Television Network).

Previous season 
The previous season the Cyclones finished the season 12–19, 6–8 in Big Eight play to finish in fifth place.  They lost to Missouri in the 1991 Big Eight conference tournament quarterfinals.

Roster

Schedule and results 

|-
!colspan=6 style=""|Exhibition

|-

|-
!colspan=6 style=""|Regular Season

|-

|-

|-

|-

|-

|-

|-

|-

|-

|-

|-

|-

|-

|-

|-

|-

|-

|-

|-

|-

|-

|-

|-

|-

|-

|-

|-

|-

|-

|-
!colspan=6 style=""|Big Eight tournament
|-

|-

|-
!colspan=6 style=""|NCAA Tournament
|-

Awards and honors 

All-Big Eight Selections

Justus Thigpen (2nd) 
Julius Michalik (HM) 
Ron Bayless (HM) 
Fred Hoiberg (HM)

Big Eight Freshman of the Year

Fred Hoiberg

Academic All-Big Eight

Mike Bergman
Greg Hester

Ralph Olsen Award

Justus Thigpen

References 

Iowa State Cyclones men's basketball seasons
Iowa State
Iowa State
Iowa State Cyc
Iowa State Cyc